Seminole is an unincorporated community in Armstrong County, Pennsylvania, United States. Seminole had its own post office until September 28, 2002; it still has its own ZIP code, 16253.

Notes

Unincorporated communities in Armstrong County, Pennsylvania
Unincorporated communities in Pennsylvania